Out Of The Bluffs is a 2009 compact disc by the University of Memphis Southern Comfort Jazz Orchestra recorded in the studio. This was their 2nd CD release since 2007. Since the late 1960s this group has been consistently recognized as one of the top collegiate jazz ensembles in the country recently being invited to the 2011 Jazz Education Network Convention, the 2000 International Association for Jazz Education Convention, and touring Europe in 1998. Musicians from this CD and program won the 2007 University of South Florida Michael Brecker Arranging Competition (David Peoples) and others went on to study with Bob Brookmeyer at the New England Conservatory of Music, Manhattan School of Music, and also work professionally at universities and major symphony orchestras.

Background
The University of Memphis Southern Comfort Jazz Orchestra CD Out Of The Bluffs was recorded to present a wide range of music to include tunes arranged of past University of Memphis alumni Mulgrew Miller and James Williams. Two tracks consisting of jazz classics from Bill Russo and Thad Jones are included; this displays the band's capabilities on historic repertoire of the jazz orchestra. Dating back to the 1960s this group has a long history of high level jazz alumni and continues to build on that tradition with this recording. U of M Jazz Orchestra alumni include James Williams, Mulgrew Miller, Tony Reedus, Donald Brown, Bill Easley, and Bill Mobley.

Reception

"Out of the Bluffs displays the Southern Comfort Jazz Orchestra in the best possible light, and is recommended as a high-class model of the kind of music that contemporary college-level Jazz ensembles are capable of producing."

Jack Bowers, All About Jazz

Track listing
Track Listing:

Recording Sessions
 December 5, 2007 at the University of Memphis, STUDIOS A/B
 April 10/11, 2008 at the University of Memphis, STUDIOS A/B

Musicians

 (1) Recorded December 5, 2007 at the University of Memphis, STUDIOS A/B
 Conductor - Dr. Jack Cooper
 1st alto saxophone - Justin Johnson
 2nd alto saxophone – Jeremy Lewis
 1st tenor saxophone - Josh McClain
 2nd tenor saxophone - Andrew Traylor
 Baritone saxophone - Justin Brown
 Lead trumpet/flugelhorn- Ken Wendt
 2nd trumpet/flugelhorn – Kevin Price
 3rd trumpet/flugelhorn – Randy Ballard
 4th trumpet/flugelhorn – Ben Pierre-Louis
 5th trumpet/flugelhorn - Paul McKinney
 Lead trombone - Anthony Williams (lead)
 2nd trombone - Victor Sawyer
 3rd trombone - Ed Morse
 4th trombone (Portrait of a Count) – David Dick
 Bass trombone - Lauren Watson
 Piano - Justin Cockerham
 Bass - Takahiro Morooka
 Drums - Jeremy Warren, Micah Lewis
 (2) Recorded April 10/11, 2008 at the University of Memphis, STUDIOS A/B
 Conductor - Dr. Jack Cooper
 1st alto saxophone – Walter Hoehn
 2nd alto saxophone – Jeremy Lewis
 1st tenor saxophone - Josh McClain
 2nd tenor saxophone - Andrew Traylor
 Baritone saxophone – Justin Brown
 Lead trumpet/flugelhorn - Ken Wendt
 2nd trumpet/flugelhorn - Kevin Price
 3rd trumpet/flugelhorn - Randy Ballard
 4th trumpet/flugelhorn – Charles Ray
 5th trumpet/flugelhorn - Ben Pierre-Louis
 1st Horn (Beautiful Friendship only)- Abby Kattentidt
 2nd Horn (Beautiful Friendship only)- Jon Schallert
 Lead trombone - Anthony Williams
 2nd trombone - Victor Sawyer
 3rd trombone - David Dick
 3rd trombone - Ed Morse
 Bass trombone- Lauren Watson
 Piano - Justin Cockerham
 Bass - Takahiro Morooka
 Drums - Jeremy Warren/Michah Lewis

Chip Henderson serves as a guest soloist on Alter Ego

Production

 Producer: Jack Cooper
 Co-jazz instructor of rhythm sections and groups for CD: Tim Goodwin
 Co-producer, mixing, editing, and additional recording: David Peoples
 Recording engineer: Jon Frazer
 Recording assistants: Jacob Fly, Mark Sylvester, Charles Glover, James Antoine, Cory Hawley, David Deleon.
 Mastering: Mark Yoshida at Audiographic Masterworks, Memphis, TN
 Photographs: Kay Yager, Josh McLain, David Bradford
 Piano technician: Scott Higgins
 Artwork: Carol Morse
 Manufactured: John Phillips, Select-O-Hits
 Liner notes: Jack Cooper

Works from the compact disc
Low-down is published by Kendor Music, Inc./BMI

Portrait of a Count is published by Sierra Music, ASCAP

References

External links
Out of the Bluffs at All Music Guide

 Out Of The Bluffs at Amazon
 OUT OF THE BLUFFS CD release, WUMR Jazz Radio, October 27, 2009

2009 albums
Jazz albums by American artists
Big band albums
Mainstream jazz albums
University of Memphis